A potential superpower is a state or other polity that is speculated to be—or to have the potential to soon become—a superpower.

Currently, only the United States fulfills the criteria to be considered a superpower. However, the United States is no longer the only uncontested foremost superpower and the world's sole hyperpower to dominate in every domain (i.e. military, culture, economy, technology, diplomatic).

Since the 1990s, China, the European Union, India, and Russia have been commonly described as potential superpowers. Japan was formerly considered a potential superpower due to its high economic growth. However, its status as a potential superpower has eroded since the 1990s due to an aging population and economic stagnation.

China 

The People's Republic of China receives continual coverage in the popular press of its potential superpower status, and has been identified as a rising or emerging economic growth and military superpower by academics and other experts. In fact, the "rise of China" has been named the top news story of the 21st century by the Global Language Monitor, as measured by number of appearances in the global print and electronic media, on the Internet and blogosphere, and in social media. The term "second superpower" has been applied by scholars to the possibility that the People's Republic of China could emerge with global power and influence on par with the United States. The potential for the two countries to form stronger relations to address global issues is sometimes referred to as the Group of Two.

Barry Buzan asserted in 2004 that "China certainly presents the most promising all-round profile" of a potential superpower. Buzan claimed that "China is currently the most fashionable potential superpower and the one whose degree of alienation from the dominant international society makes it the most obvious political challenger." However, he noted this challenge is constrained by the major challenges of development and by the fact that its rise could trigger a counter coalition of states in Asia.

Parag Khanna stated in 2008 that by making massive trade and investment deals with Latin America and Africa, China had established its presence as a superpower along with the European Union and the United States. China's rise is demonstrated by its ballooning share of trade in its gross domestic product. He believed that China's "consultative style" had allowed it to develop political and economic ties with many countries including those viewed as rogue states by the United States. He stated that the Shanghai Cooperation Organisation founded with Russia and the Central Asian countries may eventually be the "NATO of the East".

Economist and author of Eclipse: Living in the Shadow of China's Economic Dominance Arvind Subramanian argued in 2012 that China will direct the world's financial system by 2020 and that the Chinese renminbi will replace the dollar as the world's reserve currency in 10 to 15 years. The United States' soft power will remain longer. He stated that "China was a top dog economically for thousands of years prior to the Ming dynasty. In some ways, the past few hundred years have been an aberration."

Lawrence Saez at the School of Oriental and African Studies, London, argued in 2011 that the United States will be surpassed by China as military superpower within twenty years. Regarding economic power, the Director of the China Center for Economic Reform at Peking University Yao Yang stated that "Assuming that the Chinese and U.S. economies grow, respectively, by 8% and 3% in real terms, that China's inflation rate is 3.6% and America's is 2% (the averages of the last decade), and that the renminbi appreciates against the dollar by 3% per year (the average of the last six years), China will become the world's largest economy by 2021. By that time, both countries' GDP will be about $24 trillion."

Historian Timothy Garton Ash argued in 2011, pointing to factors such as the International Monetary Fund predicting that China's GDP (purchasing power parity adjusted) will overtake that of the United States in 2016, that a power shift to a world with several superpowers was happening "Now". However, China was still lacking in soft power and power projection abilities and had a low GDP/person. The article also stated that the Pew Research Center in a 2009 survey found that people in 15 out of 22 countries believed that China had or would overtake the US as the world's leading superpower.

In an interview given in 2011, Singapore's first premier, Lee Kuan Yew, stated that while China supplanting the United States is not a foregone conclusion, Chinese leaders are nonetheless serious about displacing the United States as the most powerful country in Asia. "They have transformed a poor society by an economic miracle to become now the second-largest economy in the world. How could they not aspire to be number 1 in Asia, and in time the world?" The Chinese strategy, Lee maintains, will revolve around their "huge and increasingly highly skilled and educated workers to out-sell and out-build all others." Nevertheless, relations with the United States, at least in the medium term, will not take a turn for the worse because China will "avoid any action that will sour up relations with the U.S. To challenge a stronger and technologically superior power like the U.S. will abort their 'peaceful rise.'" Though Lee believes China is genuinely interested in growing within the global framework the United States has created, it is biding its time until it becomes strong enough to successfully redefine the prevailing political and economic order.

Chinese foreign policy adviser Wang Jisi in 2012 stated that many Chinese officials see China as a first-class power which should be treated as such. China is argued to soon become the world's largest economy and to be making rapid progress in many areas. The United States is seen as a declining superpower as indicated by factors such as poor economic recovery, financial disorder, high deficits gaining close to GDP levels and unemployment, increasing political polarization, and overregulation forcing jobs overseas in China.

Some consensus has concluded that China has reached the qualifications of superpower status, citing China's growing political clout and leadership in the economic sectors has given the country renewed standings in the International Community. Although China's military projection is still premature and untested, the perceived humiliation of US leadership in failing to prevent its closest allies in joining the Asian Infrastructure Investment Bank, along with the Belt and Road Initiative and China's role in the worldwide groundings of the Boeing 737 MAX, was seen as a paradigm shift or an inflection point to the unipolar world order that dominated post-Cold War international relations. University Professor Øystein Tunsjø argues that competition between China and the USA will increase, leading to the gap between them decreasing, while the gap between the two countries and the rest of the top ten largest economies will widen. Additionally, economics correspondent, Peter S. Goodman and Beijing Bureau Chief of China, Jane Perlez further stated that China is using a combination of its economic might and growing military advancements to pressure, coerce and change the current world order to accommodate China's interests at the expense of the United States and its allies.

The 2019 Chinese Defense White Paper highlights growing strategic competition between China and the United States although it stops short of the military and ideological confrontation that was shown during the Cold War. Rather, according to Anthony H. Cordesman, although the paper flags both China and the US as competing superpowers, it was far more moderate in its treatment of the US in contrast to the United States view on Chinese military developments. Cordesman states that the paper in the end, was a warning that will shape Sino-American relations as China becomes stronger than Russia in virtually every respect other than its nuclear arsenal.

On August 19, 2019, the United States Studies Centre handed out a report, suggesting that Washington no longer enjoys primacy in the Indo-Pacific. It stresses that the War on terror has greatly distracted US response to China's role in the Pacific; that US military force in the region has greatly atrophied whereas Beijing only grew stronger and more capable since 9/11, to the point that China could now actively challenge the United States over the Indo-Pacific. According to the 2021 Asia Power Index, within Asia, the United States still takes the lead on military capacity, cultural influence, resilience, future resources, diplomatic influence, and defense networks, but falls behind China in two parameters: economic capability and economic relationships.
China's challenging the United States for global predominance constitutes the core issue in the debate over the American decline.

Contrary views 
Timothy Beardson, founder of Crosby International Holdings, stated in 2013 that he does not see "China becoming a superpower". He pointed out that China has continually polluted its environment during its 30 years of economic growth and will have to grapple with an ageing and shrinking workforce in the future.

Geoffrey Murray's China: The Next Superpower (1998) argued that while the potential for China is high, this is fairly perceived only by looking at the risks and obstacles China faces in managing its population and resources. The political situation in China may become too fragile to survive into superpower status, according to Susan Shirk in China: Fragile Superpower (2008). Other factors that could constrain China's ability to become a superpower in the future include limited supplies of energy and raw materials, questions over its innovation capability, inequality and corruption, and risks to social stability and the environment.

Amy Chua stated in 2007 that whether a country is attractive to immigrants is an important quality for a superpower. She also wrote that China lacks the pull to bring scientists, thinkers, and innovators from other countries as immigrants.

Minxin Pei argued in 2010 that China is not a superpower and it will not be one anytime soon and argued that China faces daunting political and economic challenges. In 2012 he argued that China, despite using its economic power to influence some nations, has few real friends or allies and is surrounded by potentially hostile nations. This situation could improve if regional territorial disputes were resolved and China participated in an effective regional defence system that would reduce the fears of its neighbours. Alternatively, a democratization of China could improve foreign relations with many nations.

European Union 

The European Union (EU) has been called an emerging superpower by academics. Many scholars and academics like T. R. Reid, Andrew Reding, Andrew Moravcsik, Mark Leonard, Jeremy Rifkin, and John McCormick, as well as some politicians like Romano Prodi and Tony Blair, believed that the EU either is, or will become, a superpower in the 21st century.

Mark Leonard cites several factors: the EU's large population, large economy, low inflation rates, the unpopularity and perceived failure of US foreign policy in recent years, and certain EU member states' high quality of life (especially when measured in terms such as hours worked per week, health care, social services).

John McCormick believes that the EU has already achieved superpower status, based on the size and global reach of its economy and on its global political influence. He argues that the nature of power has changed since the Cold War-driven definition of superpower was developed, and that military power is no longer essential to great power; he argues that control of the means of production is more important than control of the means of destruction, and contrasts the threatening hard power of the United States with the opportunities offered by the soft power wielded by the European Union.

Parag Khanna believes that "Europe is overtaking its rivals to become the world's most successful empire." Khanna writes that South America, East Asia, and other regions prefer to emulate "The European Dream" rather than the American variant. This could possibly be seen in the African Union and UNASUR. Notably, among the official languages of the EU are some of the world's largest and most influential languages.

Andrew Reding also takes the future EU enlargement into account. An eventual future accession of the rest of Europe, the whole of Russia, and Turkey, would not only boost its economy, but it would also increase the EU's population to about 800 million, which he considers almost equal to that of India or China. The EU is qualitatively different from India and China since it is enormously more prosperous and technologically advanced. Turkish PM Recep Tayyip Erdoğan said in 2005: "In 10 or 15 years, the EU will be a place where civilizations meet. It will be a superpower with the inclusion of Turkey."

Robert J. Guttman wrote in 2001 that the very definition of the term superpower has changed, and in the 21st century it does not only refer to states with military power, but also to groups such as the European Union, with strong market economics, young, highly educated workers savvy in high technology, and a global vision. Friis Arne Petersen, the Danish ambassador to the US, has expressed similar views but has conceded that the EU is a "special kind of superpower", one that has yet to establish a unified military force that exerts itself even close to the same level as many of its individual members.

Additionally, it is argued by commentators that full political integration is not required for the European Union to wield international influence: that its apparent weaknesses constitute its real strengths (as of its low-profile diplomacy and the emphasis on the rule of law) and that the EU represents a new and potentially more successful type of international actor than traditional ones; however, it is uncertain if the effectiveness of such an influence would be equal to that of a more politically integrated union of states such as the United States.

Barry Buzan notes that the EU's potential superpower status depends on its "stateness". It is unclear though how much state-like quality is needed for the EU to be described as a superpower. Buzan states that the EU is unlikely to remain a potential superpower for a long time because although it has material wealth, its "political weakness and its erratic and difficult course of internal political development, particularly as regards a common foreign and defence policy" constrains it from being a superpower.

Alexander Stubb, former Finnish Prime Minister, has said that he thinks the EU is both a superpower and not a superpower. While the EU is a superpower in the sense that it is the largest political union, single market and aid donor in the world, it is not a superpower in the defence or foreign policy spheres. Like Barry Buzan, Alexander Stubb thinks that the major factor constraining the EU's rise to superpower status is its lack of statehood in the international system; other factors are its lack of internal drive to project power worldwide, and continued preference for the sovereign nation-state among some Europeans. To counterbalance these, he urged the EU leaders to approve and ratify the Lisbon Treaty (which they did in 2009), create an EU foreign ministry (EEAS, established in 2010), develop a common EU defence, hold one collective seat at the United Nations Security Council and G7, and address what he described as the "sour mood" toward the EU prevalent in some European countries today.

Contrary views 

Some commentators do not believe that the EU will achieve superpower status. "The EU is not and never will be a superpower", according to the former UK Secretary of State for Foreign and Commonwealth Affairs David Miliband. Lacking a unified foreign policy and with an inability to project military power worldwide, the EU lacks "the substance of superpowers", who by definition have "first of all military reach [and] possess the capacity to arrive quickly anywhere with troops that can impose their government's will." EU parliamentarian Ilka Schroeder argues that the high degree of involvement in conflicts such as the Israeli–Palestinian conflict is used by the EU largely to compensate for European inability to project military power internationally, particularly in contrast to the US.

The Economist'''s Robert Lane Greene notes that the lack of a strong European military only exacerbates the lack of unified EU foreign policy and discounts any EU arguments towards superpower status, noting especially that the EU's creation of a global response force rivalling the superpower's (United States) is "unthinkable". Similarly, Colin S. Gray finds that “EU-Europe remains a political pygmy and all but military zero in any collective sense.”

Britain's Michael Howard has warned against the "worry" that many Europeans are pushing for greater EU integration to counterbalance the United States, while Europe's total reliance on soft (non-military) power is in part because of its lack of a "shared identity." While to some the European Union should be a "model power" unafraid of using military force and backing free trade, its military shortcomings argue against superpower status.

According to Zbigniew Brzezinski, the European Union did not produce a real "union" but a "misnomer." It failed to use the years of “Europe whole and free” to make Europe truly whole and its freedom firmly secure. The notion of Europe as “a political and military heavyweight" became "increasingly illusory.” Europe, once the centre of the West, became an extension of a West whose defining player is America.

George Osborne, former British Chancellor of the Exchequer, has also pointed out the economic crisis of the European Union. Osborne said, "The biggest economic risk facing Europe doesn't come from those who want reform and re-negotiation. It comes from a failure to reform and renegotiate. It is the status quo which condemns the people of Europe to an ongoing economic crisis and continuing decline." Osborne also said that the EU is facing growing competition with global economic powers like China, India and the US, and the European Union should "reform or decline."

On 31 January 2020, the United Kingdom, the EU's fourth largest financial contributor after Germany, France and Italy, left the European Union. This represented the first time a member state left the organization and its antecedent institutions since the European Economic Community was established in 1957. Some would even claim that Brexit could delay the EU's goal of becoming a global superpower.

 India  

The Republic of India has seen considerable coverage of its potential of becoming a superpower, both in the media and among academics. In 1998, government scientists Abdul Kalam and Y. S. Rajan co-authored book India 2020: A Vision for the New Millennium, predicting India becoming a superpower by 2020. In 2006, Newsweek and the International Herald Tribune joined several academics in discussing India's potential of becoming a superpower.

Anil Gupta is almost certain that India will become a superpower in the 21st century. As an example, he predicts that due to India's functional institutions of democracy, it will emerge as a desirable, entrepreneurial and resource and energy-efficient superpower in the near future. He had predicted that by 2015 India would overtake China to be the fastest-growing economy in the world and predicted an emergence as a full-fledged economic superpower by 2025. In addition to that, he states, India has the potential to serve as a leading example of how to combine rapid economic growth with fairness towards and inclusion of those at the bottom rungs of the ladder and of efficient resource utilization, especially in energy. India briefly became the world's fastest-growing economy in 2015 but growth declined below China's since 2018.

Economists and researchers at Harvard University have projected India's 7% projected annual growth rate through 2024 would continue to put it ahead of China, making India the fastest growing economy in the world. In 2017, Center for International Development at Harvard University, published a research study, projecting that India has emerged as the economic pole of global growth by surpassing China and is expected to maintain its lead over the 2020s.

Robyn Meredith pointed out in 2007 that the average incomes of Europeans and Americans are higher than Chinese and Indians, and hundreds of millions of Chinese, as well as Indians, live in poverty, she also suggested that the economic growth of these nations has been the most important factor in reducing global poverty of the last two decades, as per the World Bank report. Amy Chua adds to this, that India still faces many problems such as "pervasive rural poverty, entrenched corruption, and high inequality just to name a few". However, she notes that India has made tremendous strides to fix this, stating that some of India's achievements, such as working to dismantle the centuries-old caste system and maintaining the world's largest diverse democracy, are historically unprecedented.

Fareed Zakaria pointing out that India's young population coupled with the second-largest English-speaking population in the world could give India an advantage over China. He also believes that while other industrial countries will face a youth gap, India will have many young people, or in other words, workers, and by 2050, its per capita income will rise by twenty times its current level. According to Zakaria, another strength that India has is that its democratic government has lasted for 60 years, stating that a democracy can provide for long-term stability, which has given India a name.

Clyde V. Prestowitz Jr., founder and president of the Economic Strategy Institute and former counselor to the Secretary of Commerce in the Reagan administration, has predicted that "It is going to be India's century. India is going to be the biggest economy in the world. It is going to be the biggest superpower of the 21st century."

According to the report titled "Indian Century: Defining India's Place in a Rapidly Changing Global Economy" by the IBM Institute for Business Value, India is predicted to be among the world's highest-growth nations over the coming years.

 Contrary views 
Parag Khanna wrote in 2008 that he believes that India is not, nor will it become a superpower for the foreseeable future, lagging decades behind China in both development and strategic appetite. He says that India is "big but not important", has a highly successful professional class, while millions of its citizens still live in poverty. He also writes that it matters that China borders a dozen more countries than India and is not hemmed in by a vast ocean and the world's tallest mountains. However, in a recent article written by Khanna, he says that India, along with China, will grow ever stronger, while other powers, like Europe, muddle along.

Lant Pritchett, reviewing the book In Spite of the Gods: The Strange Rise of Modern India, writes that, while India has had impressive growth and has some world-class institutions, several other indicators are puzzlingly poor. The malnutrition and the coverage of immunization programs are at levels similar or worse than in many sub-Saharan African nations. In the Demographic and Health Surveys, India's child malnutrition was the worst of the 42 nations with comparable and recent data.

Adult literacy is 61%. In one study, 26% of teachers were absent from work and rd of those showing up did not teach. 40% of health care workers were absent from work. Caste politics in India remains an important force. Pritchett argues that a very large population, a very long statistical "tail" of high quality students, and some very good higher education institutions gives a misleading impression of Indian education. Indian students placed forty-first and thirty-seventh in a study comparing students in the two Indian states Odisha and Rajasthan to the forty-six nations in the 2003 Trends in International Mathematics and Science Study. In the Programme for International Student Assessment (PISA) 2009, the two Indian states ranked 72nd and 73rd out of 74 countries in both reading and mathematics, and 73rd and 74th in science.

Manjari Chatterjee Miller, assistant professor of international relations at Boston University, argues that India is a "would-be" great power but "resists its own rise". Three factors contribute to this stagnation, she argues. First, New Delhi's foreign policy decisions are highly individualistic. "This autonomy, in turn, means that New Delhi does very little collective thinking about its long-term foreign policy goals, since most of the strategic planning that takes place within the government happens on an individual level." Second, a dearth of think tanks helps insulate Indian foreign policymakers from outside influences. "U.S. foreign policymakers, by contrast, can expect strategic guidance from a broad spectrum of organizations that supplement the long-term planning that happens within the government itself." Third, many of India's political elites believe that the country's inevitable rise is a Western construct that has placed unrealistic expectations on India's economic growth forecasts and its international commitments. By contrast, Miller notes that Chinese political leaders pay very close attention to the international hype surrounding their country's growing stature. Miller concludes that "India's inability to develop top-down, long-term strategies means that it cannot systematically consider the implications of its growing power. So long as this remains the case, the country will not play the role in global affairs that many expect."

 Russia 

The Russian Federation, the world's largest nation, is home to over 30% of the world's natural resources according to some sources. Since its imperial times, it has been both a great power and a regional power. Throughout most of the Soviet-era, the Soviet Union was one of the world's two superpowers. However, after the dissolution of the Soviet Union, it lost its superpower status. In the 21st century, the major successor state Russia has been suggested as a potential candidate for resuming superpower status,New York Times by Ronald Steel professor of international relations August 24, 2008 (Superpower Reborn) while others have made the assertion that it is already a superpower. In 2009, Hugo Chavez, late President of Venezuela whose government was noted to have enjoyed warm relations with the Kremlin, stated that "Russia is a superpower" when recognizing the sovereignty of two Russia-installed separatist regimes in Georgia, citing waning American influence in global affairs, and suggested the ruble be elevated to a global currency. Israeli Prime Minister Benjamin Netanyahu called Russia an important superpower, praising its effectiveness as an ally of Israel. In his 2005 publication entitled Russia in the 21st Century: The Prodigal Superpower, Steven Rosefielde, a professor of economics at University of North Carolina at Chapel Hill, predicted that Russia would emerge as a superpower before 2010 and augur another arms race. However, Rosefielde noted that such an end would come with tremendous sacrifice to global security and the Russian people's freedom.

In 2014, Stephen Kinzer of The Boston Globe compared Russia's actions with its own neighbouring territories, to those of "any other superpower", taking Ukraine and Crimea as examples. A mixed opinion has been offered by Matthew Fleischer of the Los Angeles Times: he contends that Russia will not become a superpower unless climate change eats away at the permafrost that covers, as of March 2014, two-thirds of the country's landmass. The absence of this permafrost would reveal immense stores of oil, natural gas, and precious minerals, as well as potential farmland, which would allow Russia to "become the world's bread basket—and control the planet's food supply."

 Contrary views 
During the annual state of the nation address at the Moscow Kremlin in December 2013, Russian president Vladimir Putin denied any Russian aspiration to be a superpower. He was quoted saying: "We do not aspire to be called some kind of superpower, understanding that as a claim to world or regional hegemony. We do not infringe on anyone's interests, we do not force our patronage on anyone, or try to teach anyone how to live."

Several analysts commented on the fact that Russia showed signs of an aging and shrinking population. Fred Weir said that this severely constricts and limits Russia's potential to re-emerge as a central world power. In 2011, British historian and professor Niall Ferguson also highlighted the negative effects of Russia's declining population, and suggested that Russia is on its way to "global irrelevance". Russia has, however, shown a slight population growth since the late 2000s, partly due to immigration and slowly rising birth rates.

Nathan Smith of the National Business Review has said that despite Russia having potential, it did not win the new "Cold War" in the 1980s, and thus makes superpower status inaccurate. Dmitry Medvedev predicted that if the Russian elite is not consolidated, Russia will disappear as a single state. Vladimir Putin said the moment the Caucasus leaves Russia, other territorial regions would follow.

Paul Krugman in his New York Times'' column described Russia as a "Potemkin Superpower" in reaction to the 2022 Russian invasion of Ukraine. He stated that "Russia is even weaker than most people, myself included, seem to have realized", that the military performance of Russia "has been less effective than advertised" in a stalemate at the beginning of the invasion, and that Russia encountered serious logistical problems. Krugman observed that the country's total gross domestic product is only a bit more than half as large as those of countries such as Britain and France, despite Russia's landmass, total population and natural resource endowment. Due to the international sanctions, Russia has become even weaker economically than it did before it went to war. Its standard of living is sustained by large imports of manufactured goods, mostly paid for via exports of oil and natural gas. This leaves Russia’s economy highly vulnerable to sanctions that might disrupt this trade. He concluded "Russia now stands revealed as a Potemkin superpower, with far less real strength than meets the eye."

Former prediction for Japan's potential superpower status 

In the 1980s, many political and economic analysts predicted that Japan would eventually accede to superpower status, due to its large population, huge gross domestic product and high economic growth at that time. Japan was expected to eventually surpass the economy of the United States, which never happened. However, Japan is considered a cultural superpower in terms of the large-scale influence Japanese food, electronics, automobiles, music, video games, and anime have on the world.

Japan was ranked as the world's fourth most-powerful military in 2015. The military capabilities of the Japan Self-Defense Forces are held back by the pacifist 1947 constitution. However, there is a gradual push for a constitutional amendment. On 18 September 2015, the National Diet enacted the 2015 Japanese military legislation, a series of laws that allow Japan's Self-Defense Forces to collective self-defense of allies in combat for the first time under its constitution. In May 2017, former Japanese Prime Minister Shinzo Abe set a 2020 deadline for revising Article 9, which would legitimize the JSDF in the Constitution, but the constitutional revision was never implemented before Abe's resignation as prime minister in 2020 due to health problems.

Contrary views 
Though still the world's tenth-largest population and third-largest economy as of 2016 in terms of nominal GDP, Japan has faced an ongoing period of stagnation during the Lost Decades since the 1990s. Japan has been suffering from an aging population since the early 2000s with real decline in total population starting in 2011, eroding its potential as a superpower.

Comparative statistics

Notes

See also 

 American Century
 ASEAN
 Asian Century
 BRIC
 BRICS
 Emerging power
 Energy superpower
 Eurasian Economic Union
 Great power
 Mercosur
 Pacific Century
 Post–Cold War era
 Regional Comprehensive Economic Partnership
 Second Cold War
 South Asian Association for Regional Cooperation
 Superpower collapse

References

External links 
 Centre for Rising Powers, University of Cambridge
 China on the World Stage from the Dean Peter Krogh Foreign Affairs Digital Archives
 Blast off: India hopes Mars rocket will enhance its superpower status by The Times
 China and India: The Power of Two by Harvard Business Review
 The End of Pax Americana: How Western Decline Became Inevitable by The Atlantic
 Why The U.S. Remains The World's Unchallenged Superpower

Emerging power
21st century
Pot
Military terminology